Martin Beddington (born 18 September 1957 in Manchester), better known by his stage name Martin Bramah, is an English singer-songwriter and guitarist, best known as a founding member of the Fall, Blue Orchids, Thirst, and Factory Star.

Early career
Bramah met Mark E. Smith and original Fall keyboard player Una Baines towards the end of 1975; Bramah and founding bassist Tony Friel were friends with Smith's sister Barbara. He remained in The Fall until April 1979, having co-written most of the band's repertoire until then, including their debut album Live at the Witch Trials. He quit mid-tour due to tension between him and Smith. Simon Ford states in "Hip Priest" that Bramah's relationship with Baines was one cause of this. Bramah later claimed that the band "was getting a bit dictatorial and we were just 19–20 year-old kids. I wanted to be wild and free and do my own thing."

He formed the influential post-punk band Blue Orchids with Baines. The group had early success but went on hiatus when the couple married and had a child; they later separated. Bramah and Baines reformed the Blue Orchids in 1985 and released the single "Sleepytown"; two more singles in 1991 and 1992 featured a different line-up, with Bramah the only constant.

Bramah formed Thirst in 1987 with former Fall drummer Karl Burns, bassist Lee Pickering and guitarist Carrie Lawson. The band were more oriented towards garage rock than the influences of his earlier post-punk bands. Thirst only released one EP, Riding the Times. In 1989, Bramah rejoined The Fall to replace Brix and contributed guitar to Extricate. Bramah's second tenure in The Fall lasted just over a year, as he (together with keyboardist Marcia Schofield) was sacked at the end of the Australasian tour in July 1990. While Mark E. Smith later cited his desire to strip down the band's sound, the actual cause behind the sackings was Smith being unhappy about Bramah and Schofield having an affair.

Recent years
In 2008, he formed Factory Star, initially featuring Tim Lyons and Brian Benson (of The Sandells), subsequently featuring fellow ex-Fall members Steve Hanley on bass, Paul Hanley on drums and John Paul Moran of Rapid Pig, Gnod and the Monochrome Set on keyboards. The Hanley brothers departed during 2010 to be replaced by Chris Dutton (formerly of Sicknurse and Kill Pretty) and Tom Lewis. Their debut album Enter Castle Perilous was released on Occultation Records in 2011.

The Blue Orchids, revived by Bramah again in 2003 and featuring him as the only original member, have released seven albums of new material since 2003.

In November 2022 Bramah announced a new collaboration with Steve Hanley  - 'House Of All' which also features ex-Fall members Simon Wolstencroft, Pete Greenway and Steve's brother Paul. Their self-titled debut album will be released in April 2023 on the Tiny Global Productions label

References

Sources
 
Hanley, Steve. "The Big Midweek: Life Inside The Fall". London: Route, 2014. 

1957 births
Living people
Musicians from Manchester
English male singer-songwriters
English punk rock guitarists
The Fall (band) members
English male guitarists